Paolo Mendoza (born April 22, 1978) in Quezon City, Metro Manila, Philippines) is a Filipino professional basketball player. He last played in the Philippine Basketball Association for the Powerade Tigers. He was drafted by Sta. Lucia in 2000 as the first overall.

Player Profile

Paolo Mendoza is a certified scoring machine in his high school (UPIS) and collegiate (UP) days where he was scoring above 40 points. In an instance, he holds the UAAP junior record of most points in a single game at 69 when he led University of the Philippines Integrated School to victory over University of the East in 1994. In fact, Mendoza's 48 points – the highest output made by collegiate player – in the 1997 UAAP season stays unbreakable until now.

He is one of the factors that allowed the Realtors to capture the 2001 Governor's Cup championship, the first-ever PBA title of the team. Mendoza, along with Marlou Aquino and Dennis Espino were the last and remaining members of that 2001 champion team before the Sta. Lucia Realtors finally disbanded in 2010.

References

External links
Profile at Asia-basket.com
Statistics at worldhoopstats.com

1978 births
Filipino men's basketball players
Living people
Basketball players from Quezon City
UP Fighting Maroons basketball players
Point guards
Sta. Lucia Realtors players
Powerade Tigers players
Sta. Lucia Realtors draft picks